Damphousse is a surname. Notable people with the surname include:

 Jean Damphousse (born 1952), Canadian politician
 Jean-François Damphousse (born 1979), Canadian ice hockey player
 Vincent Damphousse (born 1967), Canadian ice hockey player